Owjan may refer to:
Owjan alternate name of Bostanabad, East Azerbaijan Province
 Owjan, Markazi
 Owjan, South Khorasan